The 2012–13 season will be Frölunda HC's 33rd season in the top Swedish league, the Elitserien (SEL). The regular season will begin on 13 September 2012 with a home game against Linköpings HC, and will conclude on 5 March 2012 on away ice against Växjö Lakers.

Pre-season

Summary
For the pre-season, Frölunda HC will participate in the 2012 European Trophy tournament, starting on 17 August 2012 and eventually ending mid-season on 22 October 2012 (although playoff participation may follow in December). The regulation round consists of four home games and four road games, for a total of eight games per team.

Standings

Playoff team seeds
The following is a list of the current six top-ranked teams aside from the two automatically qualified playoff hosts Slovan Bratislava and Vienna Capitals. The top six teams aside from Slovan Bratislava and Vienna Capitals after all regulation games will also qualify for the playoffs.

European Trophy games log

Regular season

Summary

Standings

Games log

Playoffs
Each playoff series is a best-of-seven, meaning that four wins are required to advance to the next round.

Game log

Statistics

Skaters

Transactions
Goaltending coach Micce Andréasson decided to leave Frölunda after only one season, due to his family's living situation he instead signed a one-year contract with HockeyAllsvenskan team Örebro HK. Andréasson was replaced by Jonas Forsberg, who was brought in after two seasons as the goaltending coach of Kölner Haie of the Deutsche Eishockey Liga (DEL).

Drafted players

Frölunda HC players picked in the 2013 NHL Entry Draft on June 30, 2013, at the Prudential Center in Newark, New Jersey.

References

External links
Frolundaindians.com — Official team website
Hockeyligan.se — Official league website
Swehockey.se — Official statistics website

2012-13
2012–13 Elitserien season